Standing on the Rooftop is the sixth studio album by American jazz singer Madeleine Peyroux. It was released on June 14, 2011. Peyroux had previously released an EP to promote the album, which included the cover "Martha My Dear" and the new song "The Things I Have Seen Today".

Recording
According to the EPK of the album, Peyroux had made some live demos of the songs and sent them to producer Craig Street, to which he responded well. Having lived in New York City for long periods of time, Peyroux chose to have recording sessions there in February 2011.

This was the first album of Peyroux with Decca and her first with producer Craig Street, interrupting her longtime collaboration with Larry Klein. After Bare Bones, which consisted of only original songs, Standing on the Rooftop featured originals, along with three covers, "Martha My Dear", "I Threw It All Away" and "Love in Vain", plus Marc Ribot's "Lay Your Sleeping Head, My Love", a musical adaptation of a poem by W.H. Auden. It also paired Peyroux with new songwriting partners, like Rolling Stones' bassist Bill Wyman.

Reception
The album peaked at number three at the Billboard Jazz Albums chart. The album also debuted at number sixty eight on the Canadian Albums Chart.

Track listing
 "Martha My Dear" (John Lennon, Paul McCartney) – 2:32
 "The Kind You Can't Afford" (Peyroux, Bill Wyman)– 3:59
 "Leaving Home Again" (Peyroux, Wyman)– 3:35
 "The Things I've Seen Today" (Peyroux, Jenny Scheinman)– 3:44
 "Fickle Dove" (Peyroux, Scheinman)– 3:28
 "Lay Your Sleeping Head, My Love"  (music by Marc Ribot, lyrics by W. H. Auden) – 3:23
 "Standing on the Rooftop"  (David Batteau, Peyroux)  – 5:46
 "I Threw It All Away  (Bob Dylan)  – 3:15
 "The Party Oughta Be Comin' Soon"  (Peyroux)  – 5:00
 "Superhero"  (Jonatha Brooke, Peyroux)  – 3:21
 "Love in Vain"  (Robert Johnson)  – 3:40
 "Don't Pick a Fight with a Poet"  (Peyroux, Andy Scott Rosen) – 4:28
 "Meet Me in Rio" (Peyroux)  – 3:51
 "Ophelia" (Batteau, Peyroux)  – 5:12
 "The Way of All Things" (Peyroux)  – 4:02

Personnel
 Madeleine Peyroux – vocals
 John Kirby – keyboards
 Glen Patscha – keyboards
 Patrick Warren – keyboards
 Allen Toussaint – piano
 Jenny Scheinman – violin
 Christopher Bruce – guitar
 Marc Ribot – guitar
 Meshell Ndegeocello - bass guitar
 Charley Drayton – drums
 Mauro Refosco – percussion

Charts

References

2011 albums
Madeleine Peyroux albums
Decca Records albums
Albums produced by Craig Street